13th Street is a proposed Tri-Rail Coastal Link Green Line station in Riviera Beach, Florida. The station is planned for construction at 13th Street and President Barack Obama Highway (formerly Old Dixie Highway), just west of Broadway (US 1).

References

External links
 [LINK Proposed site in Google Maps Street View]

Tri-Rail stations in Palm Beach County, Florida
Proposed Tri-Rail stations